The Women's 3000 metres event  at the 2005 European Athletics Indoor Championships was held on March 4–6.

Medalists

Note: Turkey's Tezeta Desalegn-Dengersa originally won the silver medal but was later disqualified for doping offence (metenolone).

Results

Heats
First 4 of each heat (Q) and the next 4 fastest (q) qualified for the final.

Final

References
Results

3000 metres at the European Athletics Indoor Championships
3000
2005 in women's athletics